A human interface device or HID is a type of computer device usually used by humans that takes input from humans and gives output to humans. 

The term "HID" most commonly refers to the USB-HID specification. The term was coined by Mike Van Flandern of Microsoft when he proposed that the USB committee create a Human Input Device class working group. The working group was renamed as the Human Interface Device class at the suggestion of Tom Schmidt of DEC because the proposed standard supported bi-directional communication.

HID standard 
The HID standard was adopted primarily to enable innovation in PC input devices and to simplify the process of installing such devices.  Prior to the introduction of the HID concept, devices usually conformed to strictly defined protocols for mouse, keyboards and joysticks; for example, the standard mouse protocol at the time supported relative X- and Y-axis data and binary input for up to two buttons, with no legacy support. All hardware innovations necessitated either overloading the use of data in an existing protocol or the creation of custom device drivers and the evangelization of a new protocol to developers. By contrast, all HID-defined devices deliver self-describing packages that may contain any number of data types and formats. A single HID driver on a computer parses data and enables dynamic association of data I/O with application functionality, which has enabled rapid innovation and development, and prolific diversification of new human-interface devices.

A working committee with representatives from several prominent companies developed the HID standard.  The list of participants appears in the "Device Class Definition for Human Interface Devices (HID)"
document. The concept of a self-describing extensible protocol initially came from Mike Van Flandern and Manolito Adan while working on a project named "Raptor" at Microsoft, and independently from Steve McGowan, who worked on a device protocol for Access Bus while at Forte.  After comparing notes at a Consumer Game Developer Conference, Steve and Mike agreed to collaborate on a new standard for the emerging Universal Serial Bus (USB).

The HID protocol has its limitations, but all modern mainstream operating systems will recognize standard USB HID devices, such as keyboards and mice, without needing a specialized driver. When installed, a message saying that "A 'HID-compliant device' has been recognized" generally appears on screen.  In comparison, this message does not usually appear for devices connected via the PS/2 6-pin DIN connectors which preceded USB. PS/2 does not typically support plug-and-play, which means that connecting a PS/2 keyboard or mouse with the computer powered on does not always work and may pose a hazard to the computer's motherboard. Likewise, the PS/2 standard does not support the HID protocol.  The USB human interface device class describes a USB HID.

Components of the HID protocol 
In the HID protocol, there are 2 entities: the "host" and the "device". The device is the entity that directly interacts with a human, such as a keyboard or mouse. The host communicates with the device and receives input data from the device on actions performed by the human. Output data flows from the host to the device and then to the human.  The most common example of a host is a PC but some cell phones and PDAs also can be hosts.

The HID protocol makes implementation of devices very simple. Devices define their data packets and then present a "HID descriptor" to the host. The HID descriptor is a hard coded array of bytes that describes the device's data packets. This includes: how many packets the device supports, the size of the packets, and the purpose of each byte and bit in the packet.  For example, a keyboard with a calculator program button can tell the host that the button's pressed/released state is stored as the 2nd bit in the 6th byte in data packet number 4 (note: these locations are only illustrative and are device-specific). The device typically stores the HID descriptor in ROM and does not need to intrinsically understand or parse the HID descriptor. Some mouse and keyboard hardware in the market today is implemented using only an 8-bit CPU.

The host is expected to be a more complex entity than the device. The host needs to retrieve the HID descriptor from the device and parse it before it can fully communicate with the device. Parsing the HID descriptor can be complicated.  Multiple operating systems are known to have shipped bugs in the device drivers responsible for parsing the HID descriptors years after the device drivers were originally released to the public. However, this complexity is the reason why rapid innovation with HID devices is possible.

The above mechanism describes what is known as HID "report protocol". Because it was understood that not all hosts would be capable of parsing HID descriptors, HID also defines "boot protocol". In boot protocol, only specific devices are supported with only specific features because fixed data packet formats are used. The HID descriptor is not used in this mode so innovation is limited. However, the benefit is that minimal functionality is still possible on hosts that otherwise would be unable to support HID. The only devices supported in boot protocol are
 Keyboard – Any of the first 256 key codes ("Usages") defined in the HID Usage Tables, Usage Page 7 can be reported by a keyboard using the boot protocol, but most systems only handle a subset of these keys.  Most systems support all 104 keys on the IBM AT-101 layout, plus the three extra keys designed for Microsoft Windows 95 (the left and right Windows key, and the Menu key).  Many systems also support additional keys on basic western European 105-, Korean 106-, Brazilian ABNT 107- and Japanese DOS/V 109-key layouts. Buttons, knobs and keys that are not reported on Usage Page 7 are not available.  For example, a particular US keyboard's QWERTY keys will function but the Calculator and Logoff keys will not because they are defined on Usage Page 12 and cannot be reported in boot protocol.
 Mouse – Only the X-axis, Y-axis, and the first 3 buttons will be available.  Any additional features on the mouse will not function.
One common usage of boot mode is during the first moments of a computer's boot up sequence.  Directly configuring a computer's BIOS is often done using only boot mode.
Sometimes a message will appear informing the user that the device has installed the correct driver and is now usable.

HID definition of a device 
According to the HID specification, a device is described, during the report mode, as a set of controls or group of controls.
Controls are matched by a field containing the data, and another containing a usage tag.
Each usage tag is described in the spec as the constructor suggested use of the data described in the report mode.

Other protocols using HID 
Since HID's original definition over USB, HID is now also used in other computer communication buses.  This enables HID devices that traditionally were only found on USB to also be used on alternative buses.  This is done since existing support for USB HID devices can typically be adapted much faster than having to invent an entirely new protocol to support mouse, touchpad, keyboards, and the like.  Known buses that use HID are:
 Bluetooth HID – Used for mouse and keyboards that are connected via Bluetooth
 Serial HID – Used in Microsoft's Windows Media Center PC remote control receivers.
 Zigbee input device – Zigbee (RF4CE) supports HID devices through the Zigbee input device profile.
 HID over I²C – Used for embedded devices in Microsoft Windows 8
 HID over SPI – Developed by Microsoft for faster, lower latency fixed-device communications
 HOGP (HID over GATT) – Used for HID devices connected using Bluetooth Low Energy technology

See also
 Human interface guidelines
 Human–computer interaction
 USB human interface device class
 Graphical user interface builder
 Linux on the desktop
 Peripheral
 Tangible user interface

References

External links 
HID developers forum, USB.org
 HID Device Class Definition 1.11 Specification, USB.org
 HID Usage Tables 1.12 Specification, USB.org

Human–computer interaction